The Ministry of Pensions and National Insurance (MPNI) was a British government ministry responsible for the administration and delivery of welfare benefits. It was headed by the Minister of Pensions and National Insurance.

It was created in 1953 as a result of the amalgamation of the Ministry of Pensions and the Ministry of National Insurance. In 1968 a departmental reorganisation saw the Ministry merged with the Ministry of Health to form the Department of Health and Social Security.

Ministry of Pensions
The Ministry of Pensions was created in 1916 to handle the payment of war pensions to former members of the Armed Forces and their dependants. It was expanded rapidly during the opening months of the Second World War by secondment of civil servants from the Inland Revenue and other government departments. In 1940 most of the Ministry was moved to Cleveleys and its close environs, in Lancashire. The Rossall School was taken over initially, but later several hundred employees worked in prefabricated one-storey office buildings assembled on a site that had been part of the Holt's farm in the Norcross section of Carleton. Sir Walter Womersley was the Minister during the war. Other ministers are listed under Secretary of State for Work and Pensions. The Ministry moved to buildings on Millbank in London in 1949.

References

Pensions and National Insurance
1953 establishments in the United Kingdom
1968 disestablishments in the United Kingdom
Ministries established in 1953
Government agencies disestablished in 1968
National Insurance